The East Indies and Egypt Seaplane Squadron was a formation of seaplane carriers of the British Royal Navy. It was the Royal Navy's first carrier squadron from 1916 to 1918.

History
The East Indies and Egypt Seaplane Squadron was formed in January 1916 consisting of the seaplane carriers , HMS Empress,  and HMS Anne, it was placed the command of Cecil L'Estrange Malone. The squadron, based at Port Said, was under the overall control of the Commander-in-Chief, East Indies and its primary responsibilities were to air-patrol Turkish troop positions including all movements in southern Palestine and the Sinai Peninsula. The squadron was disbanded in 1918.

Officer commanding

Included:

References

Footnotes

Sources
 Archives, The National. "Summary of operations, East Indies and Egypt seaplane squadron, R.N.A.S." discovery.nationalarchives.gov.uk. The National Archives, AIR 1/667/17/122/743, May to June 1917. 
  Buck, H. B. (2013) "The East Indies & Egypt seaplane squadron during WWI compiled by H.B. Buck RNR (Australia)". collections.anmm.gov.au. Australian National Maritime Museum. 
  Fontenoy, Paul E. (2006). Aircraft Carriers: An Illustrated History of Their Impact. Santa Barbara, California, United States: ABC-CLIO. .
  Hobbs, David (2014). "3:Seaplane Carriers". British Aircraft Carriers: Design, Development & Service Histories. Barnsley, England: Seaforth Publishing. .
 Watson, Dr Graham. (2015) "Royal Navy Organisation and Ship Deployment, Inter-War Years 1914-1918: The Grand Fleet". www.naval-history.net. Gordon Smith.

Aircraft Carrier squadrons of the Royal Navy
Military units and formations of the Royal Navy in World War I